Peter Wentworth (1601-1661) was an Anglican priest in the 17th century.

Wentworth was born in Northamptonshire. He was a Fellow of Balliol College, Oxford. He was Rector of Riseholme from 1633 to 1637, Dean of Armagh from  1637 to 1641; and Archdeacon of Carlisle from 1645.

He his last post was as Rector of Great Haseley. He died at Bath on 22 July 1661.

References

Fellows of Balliol College, Oxford
1601 births
1661 deaths
People from Northamptonshire
Deans of Armagh
Archdeacons of Carlisle